Nildandahinna is a town in Sri Lanka, located within Nuwara Eliya District. Nildandahinna Postal code is 22280. Also Sri Sumangala National College is located in Nildandahinna. Nildandahinna is administrated by Walapane Divisional Secretariat.

Geography 
 Area - 1.663 sq km 
 Elevation 1060 m (3444 ft) above sea level

Climate 
Nildandahinna has a tropical rainforest climate. It is usually (very) warm, humid and rainy all year round. It is dry for 49 days a year with an average humidity of 84% and an UV-index of 6. The temperatures range from 24 °C to just 14 °C in Nildandahinna. The terrain is mostly mountainous, with deep valleys cutting into it. The two main mountain regions are the Pidurutalagala range.

Demographics 
The population is only Sinhalese.

Administrative division 
 Walapane Divisional Secretariat.

Villages of Nildandahinna 

 Thewatta
 Dabbare
 Wangu hatha
 Nildandahinna
 Rambuke
 Walaskale

See also
Sri Sumangala National College
List of towns in Central Province, Sri Lanka

References

External links

Central Provincial Postal Codes Sri Lanka 

Populated places in Nuwara Eliya District
Towns in Central Province, Sri Lanka